Mahuari is a  village in Akorhi Gola in Pakidya Pancahyat in the Rohtas district of the Indian state of Bihar. Most of the inhabitants belong to the Brahmin and Yadav castes. It has a temple of the Goddess Durga and Khadeswari Maharaj.

Demographics

Around 211 families live there.  

According to the 2011 census, Mahuari village has a population of 1,348, of which 685 are males and 663 are females, with 265 children aged 0-6, accounting for 19.66% of the total. The average sex-ratio of Mahuari village is 968, which is lower than the Bihar state average of 918, while the child sex-ratio is 1,008, which is higher than the Bihar average of 935. 

The literacy rate in Mahauri was 60.3% in 2011, compared to 61.80% in Bihar, with male literacy rates at 75.05% and female literacy rates at 44.91%.

Geography 
Neighbouring villages include Chanp, Bhaisahi, Lilari, Majhiyawan, Bishunpur, Khapra, Saleya, Bhav, Pachapokari, and Gamharia.

Governance 
Mahuari village is administered by an elected representative known as Sarpanch (Head of Village).

Facilities
The village markets are Akorhi Gola, Dehri and Sasaram.

The village has one primary school.

Economy 
The major crops grown include: paddy, wheat, sugarcane, grams, and lentils (such as masoor dal).

References

Villages in Rohtas district